Scoob! The Album and Scoob! (Original Motion Picture Score) are the soundtracks for the 2020 film Scoob!. The former, which was released on May 15, 2020 featured original songs, "On Me" by Thomas Rhett and Kane Brown, featuring Ava Max, and "Summer Feelings" by Lennon Stella, featuring Charlie Puth. The soundtrack also includes other songs by various artists, including Sage the Gemini, R3hab, Pink Sweat$, Galantis, Best Coast, Rico Nasty, and Jack Harlow. A deluxe edition was also released on the same day, featuring four additional renditions of the tracks. The latter, featured film score composed by Tom Holkenborg and was released digitally on May 29, 2020.

Development 

On January 28, 2020, Tom Holkenborg signed on to compose the film's score. For the film's music, Holkenborg and the crew also looked back to the music of the original series as inspiration. Speaking in an interview to Comicbook.com, Holkenborg said that Scooby-doo is an "iconic character for multiple generations" and the score has "several layers in the sounds, ranging from counter-culture, surf rock and psychedelia". In the process, he mixed hip-hop beats from the 1960s with psychedelic elements for creating the score.

While creating the music, Holkenborg wanted to write several cues for every characters featured in the film. For Scoob and Shaggy, they created an emotional cue called "Coller theme" which "underscores their bonding and it comes back in various tones" and also wrote a "shenanigans" theme, for the fun elements shared between the two characters. Several characters, such as Dusty, Cerrabus, Caveman, Dastardly and Muttley, had independent themes, while Blue Falcon, Dynomutt and the Falcon Ship, had "heroic themes".

Dastardly's theme was created with urban beats with industrial sounds, and Muttley's theme was curated with distorted synths and growling bass sounds. For Caveman, he created a Dutch music style called Gabber, a distorted house music in the 1960s. For "Mystery Inc." Holkenborg had created a separate cue with the 1960s hip-hop genres and sampled it with the sound of modern elements, to create the vibe from the television show. They also played surf guitars, and hammond organs for the score.

The original audio from Scooby-Doo television series, was found at the archives of Warner Bros. Studios, Burbank.

Track listing

Scoob! The Album 
Scoob! The Album's track list was first released on May 11, 2020, with two original songs, "On Me" by Thomas Rhett and Kane Brown, featuring Ava Max, and "Summer Feelings" by Lennon Stella, featuring Charlie Puth, were featured, while other artists such as Sage the Gemini, R3hab, Pink Sweat$, Galantis, Best Coast, Rico Nasty, and Jack Harlow, also perform their songs. The former was released on May 14, as a single, and the soundtrack was released in its entirety on May 15, along with its deluxe edition.

Scoob! (Original Motion Picture Score) 
Holkenborg's score was released as Scoob! (Original Motion Picture Score) on May 29.

Additional music 
Songs that are not featured in the soundtrack, but included in the film are:

 "California Love (Remix)" - 2Pac, Dr. Dre, Roger Troutman
 "Show Me the Meaning of Being Lonely" - The Backstreet Boys
 "One" - Three Dog Night
 "Mr. Lonely" - Bobby Vinton
 "Shallow" - Lady Gaga, Bradley Cooper
 "Baby Talk" - Jan & Dean
 "Sirius" - The Alan Parsons Project
 "All I Do Is Win" - DJ Khaled ft. T-Pain, Ludacris, Snoop Dogg, Rick Ross
 "Let's Get It On" - Marvin Gaye
 "R.O.B." - Outkast

Reception 
Holkenborg's score received positive response from Jonathan Broxton, stating "Tom Holkenborg’s writing has become so much richer, so much more impressively complicated, and so much more intellectually stimulating". In contrast, James Southall of Movie Wave wrote "We have some classic cartoonish mickey-mousing (the Remote Control sound on the orchestra); we have some mock-gothic horror music; surf rock; some big action cues; some classic heist-style music; some modern electronic stuff but nowhere near as much "industrial, hip-hop and even gabber". It’s good-natured music but flits about all over the place, from one style to another every few seconds – it must have been exhausting to write and it is exhausting to listen to." Filmtracks gave a mixed review, stating "Together, these elements, despite their somewhat smart design, never coalesce into a truly functional film score, the main themes underplayed and the narrative badly neglected. It's a resume-builder for Holkenborg, surely, but an obnoxious one at that."

References 

2020 soundtrack albums
Atlantic Records soundtracks
WaterTower Music soundtracks
Junkie XL albums
Scooby-Doo